Face of Courage: Morgan Tsvangirai is a biography of Morgan Tsvangirai written by Sarah Hudleston, tracing his trade union roots, his rise to the leadership of the Movement for Democratic Change and the government's attempts to implicate him in a treason plot.

Against a backdrop of the social, political and economic developments in Zimbabwe, this book focuses on the life and career of Morgan Tsvangirai. It draws on interviews with Tsvangirai and those close to him.

See also
Morgan Tsvangirai
Movement for Democratic Change
Robert Mugabe

References

Further reading 
 Stephen Chan; Citizen of Africa: Conversations with Morgan Tsvangirai;  (2005)
 George Bizos; Odyssey to Freedom;  (2007)

2005 non-fiction books
Biographies about politicians
History of Zimbabwe